Gnudi is a surname. Notable people with the surname include:

 Martha Gnudi (1941–1976), American medical historian and translator
 Piero Gnudi (born 1938), Italian tax adviser, manager, and politician
  (1910–1981), Italian art historian